Kirchlengern is a railway station located in Kirchlengern, Germany. The station is located on the Löhne–Rheine line. The train services are operated by Eurobahn, NordWestBahn and WestfalenBahn.

Train services
The following services currently call at Kirchlengern:

Regional services  Rheine - Osnabrück - Minden - Hannover - Braunschweig
Local services  Bad Bentheim - Rheine - Osnabrück - Herford - Bielefeld
Local services  Rahden - Bünde - Herford - Bielefeld
Local services  Bünde - Löhne - Hamelin - Hildesheim

Notes 

Railway stations in North Rhine-Westphalia
Railway stations in Germany opened in 1855